Lille Strandstræde 20 is a Neoclassical property located off Sankt Annæ Plads in central Copenhagen, Denmark. Built in 1797 and heightened with one storey in 1854–55, it was for many years home to cartwright Henry Fife's workshop. The four-winged complex was listed in the Danish registry of protected buildings and places in 1918.

History

19th century

The site was in the late 17th century part of a larger property. It was by 1689 as No. 25 in St. Ann's East Quarter (Sankt Annæ Øster Kvarter) owned by engraver Johan Dorn's widow Ellgen. This property was later divided into a number of smaller properties. The property now known as Lille Strandstræde 20 was by 1756 as No. 97 owned by rear admiral Olfert Fischer.

The property was home to 17 residents at the 1787 census. Johan Jacob Frolich (1746-1801), a merchant, resided in the building with his wife Bernhardina Spengler, their four children (aged one to seven), his partners Emanuel Falckner and Johann Rudolph Meyer, æpdger Jacob Christiansen, a housekeeper, a maid, a female cook, two nannys and a 14-year-old boy.

C. C. Lütken and the new building
The present building on the site was constructed in 1797 for merchant C. C. Lütken.

The property was home to 19 residents in just two households at the time of the 1801 census. Christian Ludvig Lytken (1750-1813)	resided in the building with his wife Marie Juliane Johanne Lytken (née Schinmeier), their five children (aged one to 13), his mother-in-law Marie Dorothea Magdalene Schinmeier, three clerks (employees), a female cook, one male servant, three maids and the lodger Johan Fransen. The eldest of his two daughters was the later painter Julie Lütken. Johan Steck, a workman, resided in the building with his wife Johanne Cathrine (née Steck).

The property was listed in the new cadastre of 1806 as No. 65 in St. Ann's East Quarter. It was owned by P. L. Lütken at that time. It was later passed down to naval officer Magnus Lytken. The physician J. D. Brandis (1762-1845) was from 1822 to 1834 also among the residents in the building.

William C. Good
The property was acquired by William C. Good in 1919. Good was the son of British born merchant in Helsingør John Good. He had owned the sugar refinery Union House in Christianshavn prior to its closure in 1801.

Fife family
 
In 1824 the property was acquired by coach builder George James Fife. He had just taken over his father's former coach workshop, which was now moved from its former location in the Stanley House in Christianshavn to his new property in Lille Strandstræde.

George James Fife died from gangrene on 14 September 1926. His workshop was then continued by his mother with his younger brother, Henry Fife (1804-1986), as manager. After a while, Henry Fie took ownership both of the property and the workshop. The workshop developed into the leading Danish coach builder under his management. It delivered at least 86 coaches to the Danish royal family in 183100, including Christian VIII's Gold Coupé in 1840.

The property was at the time of the 1840 census home to a total of 24 people. Henry Fife was residing with his family in the ground floor apartment. Cathrine Talbot, widow of a leather manufacturer, was also living on the ground floor. Ann O’Keeffe Oxholm, widow of former governor of the Danish West Indies Peter Lotharius Oxholm, resided with her 18-year-old daughter Hilda on the first floor. Maren Svinth Lindahl (née Olsdatter Svinth, 1775–1845), widow of generalauditør Hans Jacob Lindahl (c. 1762–1812), was residing with her two sons on the second floor.

The jurist and politician Hother Hage (1816-1873) was among the residents in 1859.

The property was home to 147 residents in 32 households at the 1860 census. Henry Fife resided in one of the rear wings with his wife, seven children, two maids and one lodger (workman).  Lars Peter Christensen, another master carriage maker, resided in the building with his wife Marie Dorthea Christensen	and three of their children (aged 13 to 22). Johan Peter Ferslew, a turner (probably associated the carriage factory as a subcontractor), resided in the building with his wife Marie Frederikke Ferslew, one maid, three turners (employees) and three apprentices.  B. N. H. Flensborg, widow of former general and Defence Minister Carl Julius Flensborg, resided in the building with her 20-year-old son Carl Julius Flensborg and one maid.  Annette Chr. Bruun, widow of a musician in the Rotal Danish Orchestra, resided in the building with her 21-year-old daughter Helene Marie Bruun, one maid and the husjomfru Anna Maria Aagesen.  Morten Hassing (1813-1863), a chief physician and professor, resided in the building with his wife Olivia Sophie Jacobine Hassing, their four children (aged one to six). Frederik Hendrik Eibe, a bookdealer (shop at Hråbrødretorv/Køvstræde 8), resided in the building with his wife Ida Camilla Eibe, their six children (aged one to 12), a female cook, a maid and a nanny. August Sophus, Count Tramp, a chamberlain at the Queen's court, resided in the building with his wife 	Julie Grevinde Tramp, their four children (aged  six to 18), one male servant and three maids.  Jacob Rabe, a ship captain (of a merchant ship), resided in the building with his wife Marie Elisabeth Rabe, their 14-year-old son  son Johan Jacob Rabe, 23-uear-old Anna H. M. Bergfelt and one maid.  Niels Christian Thorvald Tohff, and assistant in the Bank of Denmark (exam. juris.), resided in the building on his own. Wilhelm Emil Lange, another ship captain (of a merchant ship), resided in the building with his wife Emilie Lange, their 16-year-old daughter Elisabeth Lange, 15-year-old Harriet Rise and two maids. Laurits Martin Frederik Meinche, a retired army major, resided in the building with his wife Laura Louise Emilie Meinckem two sons (aged two and four) and one maid. Jens Eggersen, a workman, resided in the building with his wife Benthe Cathr. Eggersen, their two daughters (aged four and 11) and two lodgers. Jacob Damcke, a cook (hushofmester), resided in the building with his wife Anna Elisa Damcke and one lodger. Antoinette Prieme, a widow employed with needlework, resided in the building with her seven-year-old daughter. Dorthea Cathrine Christensen, another widow employed with needlework, resided in the building with her 10-year-old daughter. Johan Michael Berg, a workman, resided in the building with his wife Ane Olsen Berg and their three children (aged nine to 15). Ludvig Georg Petersen, a building painter, resided in the building with his wife Hansine Dorth. Petersen, their three children (aged t20 to nine) and one lodger. Bendt Olsen, a carriage maker (employee), resided in the building with his wife Dorthea Lovise Olsen, their three children (aged one to nine) and three lodgers. Kirstine Jensen, widow of a royal stage coach driver, resided in the building with two of her children (aged 24 and 28). Peter Petersen, who was employed in the prince's kitchen, resided in the building with his wife Margrethe Petersen and their four children (aged four to 16).

Henry Fife's widow Louise Augusta Fife (née Mørk) was at the time of the 1880 census still residing in the building with four unmarried children and two maids. James John Falbor Fife was now managing the family carriage factory.

20th century

The physician Andreas Brünniche lived in the building at the turn of the century. The author Herman Bang was from July 1909 to August 1911 among the residents in the building. The businessman and former minister of trade Tyge Rothe (1877-1970) resided on the third floor from 1933 to 1940.

 
Dines Petersen & Co., a wholesale business, was based in the building in 1950. The company had been founded by Peter Dines Petersen (1859-1944) in 1896. It was in 1910 taken over by Halfdan Hendriksen (1881-) and S. N. S. Holm (1883-). The latter left the company in 1924. In 1946m it was taken over by V. M. Jacobsen (1903-) and Kaj Kongstad (1902-).

S. Kjersgaard & Co., another company, has also been based in the building.

Architecture
The building is in four storeys over a raised cellar.  The nine-bay facade is rendered white with rusticated finishing on the ground floor. A gateway is located in the central bay and the two outer bays. The windows in the two slightly projecting outer bays are topped by rounded pediments on the first floor and the seven central windows are topped by a frieze. The rook features seven dormer windows.

The gateway opens to a small courtyard. The two perpendicular side wings are younger than the front wing but it is not known exactly when they were building. The rear wing is from 1858.

Today
Lille Strandstræde 20 contains a single condominium on each floor. It is owned by E/F Lille Strandstræde 20.

References

External links

 Ann O’Keeffe Oxholm at Geni
 Source
 Source

Listed residential buildings in Copenhagen
Neoclassical architecture in Denmark
Residential buildings completed in 1797
1797 establishments in Denmark